Mouloundou is a department of Ogooué-Lolo Province in eastern Gabon. The capital lies at Lastoursville. It had a population of 27,750 in 2013.

Towns and villages
Lastoursville
Mbonha
Mahouna
Mikouya

References

 
Departments of Gabon
Ogooué-Lolo Province